The Battle of Tuchola Forest was one of the first battles of World War II, during the invasion of Poland. The battle occurred from 1 September to 5 September 1939 and resulted in a major German victory. Poor Polish command and control, as well as German numerical and tactical superiority, allowed the Germans to manage to cripple Poland's Armia Pomorze (Army Pomerania) and, by breaking through the Polish Corridor, to connect mainland Germany with East Prussia. 

The battle was fought against the judgment of General Władysław Bortnowski, the commander of Army Pomerania, who believed the Corridor to be a very poor defensive position and had repeatedly asked for permission to withdraw his forces from it.

Prelude 

Tuchola Forest in Westprussia, since 1920 Treaty of Versailles in the Polish Corridor, is a large area of mostly forest. Its difficult terrain was thought by the Polish high command as a good defensive position. However, the Germans had held their Truppenübungsplatz Gruppe military exercises in the area until 1919, and were therefore familiar with it, and furthermore General Heinz Guderian had been born in nearby Chełmno).

Polish forces in the theater comprised elements of the Pomeranian Army: 9th Infantry Division under colonel Józef Werobej, the 27th Infantry Division under general Juliusz Drapella, and Czersk Operational Group under gen. Stanisław Grzmot-Skotnicki.

German forces in the theater were composed of elements of the 4th German Army under general Günther von Kluge, specifically 19th Panzer Corps (commanded by general Heinz Guderian), and 2nd Army Corps under general Adolf Strauß. Those units were based in Western Pomerania west of the corridor.

19th Panzer Corps consisted of the 2nd Motorized Division under general Paul Bader, the 20th Motorized Division under general Mauritz von Wiktorin and the 3rd Panzer Division under general Leo Geyr von Schweppenburg. 2nd Army Corps was composed of two infantry divisions: the 3rd Infantry Division under general Walter Lichel and 32nd Infantry Division under general Franz Böhme.

Battle 
Despite several tactical Polish victories, including the successful cavalry charge at Krojanty on 1 September, and the destruction of a German armored train near Chojnice, the German armies were able to advance quickly. Not all Polish forces were in position by 1 September and the rapid German advance generated confusion in the Polish ranks. In addition, communications problems prevented cohesive action on the part of the scattered Polish forces. The Poles were soon forced to abandon plans for a counterattack and retreated, pursued by more mobile German motorized and armored troops. The German forces had a significant amount of armor support, including over 300 tanks commanded by the famous panzer expert Guderian.

Most Polish units were surrounded by 3 September. Some were destroyed, while others managed to break through towards Bydgoszcz.

Aftermath 

By 5 September the Germans had in large part completed their takeover of the Polish Corridor. At that point some German forces moved to erase isolated pockets of Polish resistance further north in fortified areas on the Baltic Coast, while others continued their push south-east, deeper into Polish territory.

On 6 September, Adolf Hitler visited Guderian and congratulated him on his swift progress.

About two-thirds of Armia Pomorze survived the battle, regrouped, and were reconstituted under  Armia Poznań (Army Poznań) in time to fight in the Polish counteroffensive at the Battle of the Bzura .

Order of battle

Polish

German

See also 

 List of World War II military equipment of Poland
 List of German military equipment of World War II

References

Further reading 
 Steven J. Zaloga, Polish Army, 1939–1945, Osprey Publishing, 1982,

External links

  Battle of Tuchola Forest at www.1939.pl

Conflicts in 1939
1939 in Poland
Tuchola Forest
Battles of World War II involving Germany
Pomeranian Voivodeship (1919–1939)
September 1939 events